The 2007–08 San Diego Toreros men's basketball team represented the University of San Diego during the 2007–08 NCAA Division I men's basketball season. The Toreros were led by first-year head coach Bill Grier. They played their home games at Jenny Craig Pavilion in San Diego, California as members of the West Coast Conference. The Toreros finished the season 22–14, 11–3 in WCC play to finish in 3rd place. They won the WCC tournament to receive an automatic bid to the NCAA tournament as No. 13 seed in the West region. In the opening round, San Diego upset No. 4 seed Connecticut in overtime, but fell to No. 12 seed Western Kentucky in the round of 32.

Roster

Schedule and results

|-
!colspan=12 style=| Non-conference regular season

|-
!colspan=12 style=| WCC regular season

|-
!colspan=12 style=| WCC tournament

|-
!colspan=12 style=| NCAA tournament

Source:

References

San Diego Toreros men's basketball seasons
San Diego
San Diego
San Diego Toreros
San Diego Toreros